John Henry Weber (1779–1859) was an American fur trader and explorer. Weber was active in the early years of the fur trade, exploring territory in the Rocky Mountains and areas in the current state of Utah. The Weber River, Weber State University, and Weber County, Utah were named for Weber.

Early life
John Henry Weber was born in the town of Altona, then part of Denmark and now a borough of Hamburg in Germany. Weber immigrated to the United States where he was hired by the United States Army Ordnance Department to keep records for the government-owned lead mines in Sainte Genevieve, Missouri.

Into the Fur Trade
Weber became acquainted with William Henry Ashley and Andrew Henry who conducted the beaver trade in the drainage of the Upper Missouri River. He joined a Rocky Mountain Fur Company expedition which departed St. Louis, Missouri in the spring of 1822. Other trappers in this group included: Jim Bridger, David Jackson, Jedediah Smith, Thomas Fitzpatrick, Hugh Glass, James Clyman, Daniel T. Potts, and Milton Sublette. This was the first party of American trappers to cross the continental divide.

Upon reaching the mouth of the Yellowstone River, the company divided into two independent brigades, with Weber serving in a leadership position. During the summer of 1824, Weber's brigade crossed South Pass and the Green River Valley and descended into the Bear River region in time for a fall hunt. As winter approached, the company journeyed to Bear Lake, then to the Bear River's northern bend and finally south into what is today Utah's Cache Valley. The brigade spent the winter of 1824–25 on Cub Creek near present-day Cove, Utah. While in Cache Valley, the group discussed the possible course and ultimate outlet of the Bear River. According to his own account, the young Bridger was selected to settle the question by floating down the river. For many years Bridger was credited for the discovery of the Great Salt Lake. More recent evidence suggests, that Canadian-American Etienne Provost and his trapping party, working out of Taos in Mexican territory, visited the southern edge of the inland sea earlier in the same winter.

The following spring, Weber's brigade traveled throughout extreme southeastern Idaho and northern Utah. A portion of the brigade, under the leadership of Johnson Gardner, confronted Peter Skene Ogden, the leader of Hudson's Bay Company (HBC) Snake Country Expedition near present-day Mountain Green, Utah. Gardner insisted that they were in United States territory. Ogden countered that the area in contention was under joint occupation. During the incident, Gardner was able to lure a number of men, many of them Canadian Iroquois, away from their British employer by offering higher prices for their furs. The reduction in force led Ogden to retrace his steps back to the HBC "Flathead House" near Flathead Lake in modern Montana. That summer, Weber and his brigade were at the first rendezvous held in Sweetwater County, Wyoming, near present McKinnon, just north of the Utah border.

Weber's remaining mountain years are less well documented; however, he spent the winter of 1825-26 in the Salt Lake Valley after Ashley's men were forced by severe winter weather to move their winter quarters from Cache Valley. It appears that Utah's Weber River was christened, during this winter camp. This Weber place-naming gave rise to the present names of Utah's Weber Canyon, Weber County and Weber State University.

Weber attended the rendezvous of 1826, in Cache Valley and left the fur trade, and the West, shortly thereafter. However, some accounts confuse John Henry Weber with a trapper named John Weber, who was killed by Indians in the winter of 1828-29.

Later years and death
Weber spent the remainder of his life in the American Midwest, first returning to Ste. Genevieve, Missouri and his former position, as recorder with the U.S. government, lead mines. In 1833, Weber was the assistant superintendent of U.S. government lead mines in Galena, Illinois, and served briefly, as superintendent, until his retirement in 1840. Weber moved to Bellevue, Jackson County, Iowa, where he died by suicide in February, 1859.

Pronunciation
The proper pronunciation of Weber's surname, Weeber or Webber, has been debated. In the American East and Midwest, where Weber spent most of his life, the name is pronounced as Webber. This is substantiated by Warren Angus Ferris' map of the fur trade era in which he gives the name of the Weber River as "Webber's Fork." However, references by other fur trappers, such as Osborne Russell and Daniel Potts, give credence to the long vowel sound. The long vowel pronunciation is used in all Utah place names. Weber's own family descendants use the traditional Midwest pronunciation of Webber. Weber was born in Altona, Hamburg, Germany and if you look at the pronunciation of the word in German it would sound more like "Vee-bar". There is no other word in the English language pronounced "weeber". Therefore, if you are speaking German it would be "Veebar", if you are speaking English it would be "Webber." It is safe to assume that the mispronunciation originated from hearing Weber say his name with a German accent, and combining the spelling (with a W) and the pronunciation (with a VEE) to create "Weeber."

References

Sources

Hafen, LeRoy R., ed. (2003) The Mountain Men and the Fur Trade of the Far West (Glendale, California: Arthur H. Clark Company. volume 9, pages 379–384) 
Morgan, Dale L. (1964) The West of William H. Ashley (Old West Publishing Company) 
Roberts, Richard C., and Sadler, Richard W. (1997) A History of Weber County (Salt Lake City: Weber County Commission) 
Walker J.P. (2015) The Legendary Mountain Men of North America (Lulu.com)

External links
The Fur Trade in Utah

1779 births
1859 deaths
American explorers
American fur traders
Danish emigrants to the United States
Danish people of German descent
People from Altona, Hamburg
Mountain men